The Gray Wolf's Ghost is a 1919 American silent Western film directed by Park Frame and Joseph Franz and starring Lurline Lyons, Rita Stanwood and Hector V. Sarno.

Cast
 Lurline Lyons as Dona Maria Saltonstall
 Rita Stanwood as Señorita Maruja Saltonstall
 Hector V. Sarno as Pereo
 Violet Schram as Pequita
 H.B. Warner as Doctor West / Harry West
 Lloyd Whitlock as Jim Prince
 George Field as Miguel
 Edward Peil Sr.
 Marin Sais

References

Bibliography
 Robert B. Connelly. The Silents: Silent Feature Films, 1910-36, Volume 40, Issue 2. December Press, 1998.

External links
 

1919 films
1919 Western (genre) films
American black-and-white films
Films directed by Park Frame
Films directed by Joseph Franz
Film Booking Offices of America films
Silent American Western (genre) films
1910s English-language films
1910s American films